Now You See It, Now You Don't may refer to:

 Now You See It, Now You Don't, a 1968 television movie starring Jonathan Winters
 "Now You See It, Now You Don't: Part One," a 1979 episode of The Jeffersons
 Now You See It- Now You Don't, a track from the 1981 Frank Zappa album Tinseltown Rebellion
 Now You See It (Now You Don't), a track from the 1983 Ozzy Osbourne album Bark at the Moon
 Now You See It… (Now You Don't), a 1990 album by Michael Brecker
 Love: Now You See It... Now You Don't, a 1992 Hong Kong film directed by Mabel Cheung and Alex Law

See also 
 Now You See Me (disambiguation)
 Now You See Me, Now You Don't (disambiguation)
 Now You See It (disambiguation)
 Now You See Him, Now You Don't, a 1972 Walt Disney film